Andrew Hacker (born 1929) is an American political scientist and public intellectual.

He is currently Professor Emeritus in the Department of Political Science at Queens College
in New York. He did his undergraduate work at Amherst College, followed by graduate work at Oxford University, University of Michigan, and Princeton University, where he received his PhD degree. Hacker taught at Cornell before taking his current position at Queens. He is the son of Louis M. Hacker.

His most recent book, Higher Education? was written in collaboration with Claudia Dreifus, his wife, a New York Times science writer and Columbia University professor. Professor Hacker is a frequent contributor to the New York Review of Books. In his articles he has questioned whether mathematics is necessary, claiming "Making mathematics mandatory prevents us from discovering and developing young talent."

Publications 
 Hacker, A., (1961) Political Theory: Philosophy, Ideology, Science, The Macmillan Company
 Hacker, A., (1992) Two Nations: Black and White, Separate, Hostile, Unequal, Scribner. 
 Hacker, A., (1998) Money: Who Has How Much and Why, Simon and Schuster. 
 Hacker, A., (2003) Mismatch: The Growing Gulf Between Women and Men. Scribner. 
 Hacker, A. and Claudia Dreifus, (2010) Higher Education?: How Colleges Are Wasting Our Money and Failing Our Kids - and What We Can Do About It Holt, Henry & Company, Inc. 
 Hacker, A., (2012) "Is Algebra Necessary?", New York Times, Published July 28, 2012. https://www.nytimes.com/2012/07/29/opinion/sunday/is-algebra-necessary.html
 Hacker, A., (2016) "The Math Myth: And Other STEM Delusions," The New Press.

References

External links 
 "The Math Myth And Other STEM Delusions"—an argument that requiring all students to master a full menu of mathematics is causing more harm than good. http://themathmyth.net/
 Author page at The New York Review of Books
 Blurb written by the author for "Mismatch" on the Simon and Schuster website
 Article about Claudia Dreifus at the East Hampton Star website

1929 births
Living people
American political scientists
Cornell University faculty
Amherst College alumni
Horace Mann School alumni
Queens College, City University of New York faculty
University of Michigan alumni